The Kigamboni Naval Base is a naval base in Dar es Salaam, Tanzania.

History
The base was built with assistance from China. President Julius Nyerere laid the foundation stone on 6 May 1970.

References

External links
 
 China and Tanzania conclude historic naval exercise

Tanzania Navy bases